Popcornella is a genus of Caribbean jumping spiders that was first described by J. X. Zhang & Wayne Paul Maddison in 2012.

Species
 it contains four species, found only in Puerto Rico and on Hispaniola:
Popcornella furcata Zhang & Maddison, 2012 – Hispaniola
Popcornella nigromaculata Zhang & Maddison, 2012 – Puerto Rico
Popcornella spiniformis Zhang & Maddison, 2012 (type) – Hispaniola
Popcornella yunque Zhang & Maddison, 2012 – Puerto Rico

References

Salticidae genera
Salticidae
Spiders of the Caribbean